June Angela Profanato  (born August 18, 1959) is an American actress, singer, and dancer. Her best-known role is that of Julie, the mainstay member of the Short Circus band that was featured in the PBS children's television series The Electric Company during its entire six-year run.

Early years
Working since age 5, she considered her American-Asian self, half culturally inhibited and reserved, and the other half brazenly bold with a New York state of mind as an East Coaster. In the attempt to straighten out her pigeon-toed feet, she was first-assigned to ballet lessons by her supportive parents. Plowing a trail beyond her early beginnings of ballet, jazz and tap, she always knew what she wanted to do. However, her parents had rules. There was no room to be a show biz brat or she would be out. She also had to do well with her school work. She adhered to household parameters and graduated from SUNY Empire State College at the age of 18. 

There were no Asian-American role models specific to her being initially inspired to map out a plan. She, as a young child was the live version of the Jan Doll in a commercial of the [Remco] Asian toy, who would raise her hand to wave hi. She didn’t think so much at that age about representing Asian girls as she entered the field. She focused on what was in front of her. With determination to endure in the industry by simply doing what she loved, she pushed herself forward at the beginning of her career. However, it was her heart, dedication and the hard work which she had applied to her show business craft that had her juggling a very busy and full life before becoming an adult.

The Short Circus
As Julie, Angela grew up on The Electric Company. She was awarded an Emmy of Honor for her work on the series. Angela sang on the Grammy Award-winning 1971 soundtrack album of The Electric Company as well. Angela said she named her Short Circus character Julie after her idol at the time, Julie Andrews.

Career highlights
When The Electric Company began wrapping production, Angela became a regular on the first Asian American TV comedy series Mr. T and Tina (ABC) where she and her brother played Pat Morita's children. Numerous works in theater and television followed. Most notably she was nominated for Broadway's Tony and Drama Desk Award as Best Leading Actress in a Musical for Shogun: The Musical. In 2017, she starred opposite Danny Glover as his wife in the two-character play Yohen at East West Players in Los Angeles and currently recurs as Madame Xing, Jessica’s psychic on the ABC TV series Fresh Off the Boat.

She co-starred as Tuptim with Yul Brynner in the Broadway & London Palladium Revival of The King and I  and starred in many world premieres including Sayonara and Off-Broadway's Cambodia Agonistes at Pan Asian Repertory Theatre. For Velina Hasu Houston's Tea, she won a Theater Guild Award for Best Lead Actress. Additionally, on television, she starred alongside Cloris Leachman and Pat Morita, once again, in a TV drama, Blind Alleys written by David Henry Hwang and Frederic Kimball. 
She then went to Kyoto to film the TV movie American Geisha (CBS), which was based on the autobiographical book by Liza Dalby.

Other TV roles include recurring on Mad TV, starring in Nightingale, ER, Step By Step, Hannah Montana and Dexter. She was also featured on the Emmy Award-winning special Free to be You and Me, which starred numerous luminaries.   Her voice work includes the Emmy Award-winning series The Big Blue Marble Nickelodeon's The Wild Thornberrys, Danny Phantom and Walt Disney Studios' English dub of the acclaimed Hayao Miyazaki animated film Kiki's Delivery Service for which she did voices and is also co-writer of "Soaring", the main title song.

Angela holds the distinction of making the youngest solo soprano debut at age 10 as Flora in Benjamin Britten's The Turn of the Screw with the New York City Opera at Lincoln Center. Later, Angela's solo album, released on Original Cast Records, features a full orchestra on songs from shows she has done, which includes a medley from The Electric Company and several jazz numbers.

Angela was interviewed for the 2006 DVD release of The Best of The Electric Company. She was one of several Electric Company alumni (along with Morgan Freeman and Rita Moreno and Children's Television Workshop founder Joan Ganz Cooney) who shared their memories of working on the show.

Angela was levitated atop the World Trade Center by Doug Henning in the "highest levitation in the world". In June 1976, the photo was featured on the cover of The Electric Company Magazine.

She has recorded over 40 audiobook titles using different character voices primarily for children on Audible.

References

External links
 

1959 births
Living people
American child actresses
American musical theatre actresses
American stage actresses
American television actresses
American child singers
American voice actresses
American tap dancers
American women singers
American singers of Asian descent
American actresses of Japanese descent
Singers from New York City
21st-century American actresses